Joseph Toby (born February 6, 1989)  is a Sierra Leone-American soccer player who plays as a defender. He came from Sierra Leone to Florida at the age of 15 in 2004.''

Career

College

Toby a four-year starter at Flagler College, where he received numerous awards and accolades. Toby was a three-time National Soccer Coaches Association of America (NSCAA) All-Southeast Region selection, a Daktronics First-Team All-American in 2011, a two-time Daktronics All-Region pick and was a three-time All-Peach Belt Conference First-Team selection. During that time, Toby appeared in 80 matches, scored 25 goals, and notched 22 assists.

Professional
Toby signed with Jacksonville Armada FC of the North American Soccer League on February 2, 2015. He was released by Jacksonville in November 2015.

References

External links
Flagler Saints bio

1989 births
Living people
American soccer players
Orlando City U-23 players
FC JAX Destroyers players
IMG Academy Bradenton players
Orlando City SC (2010–2014) players
Phoenix Rising FC players
Jacksonville Armada FC players
USL League Two players
USL Championship players
North American Soccer League players
Association football defenders